Henry John Klutho (1873–1964) was an American architect known for his work in the "Prairie School" style. He helped in the reconstruction of Jacksonville, Florida after the Great Fire of 1901—the largest-ever urban fire in the Southeast—by designing many of the new buildings built after the disaster. This period lasted until the beginning of World War I. Several Jacksonville architects began their careers in the offices of Klutho's firm.

Early life
Klutho was born in Breese, Illinois, a small midwest town. He lived there until the age of 16, when he left for St. Louis, Missouri to study business. When he became interested in architecture, he moved to New York City to learn more, and became an architect.

Work
Klutho read about the Great Fire of 1901 in the New York Times and recognized the opportunity of a lifetime. He finished his current projects in New York and quickly moved to Jacksonville. Klutho introduced himself to prominent businessmen and politicians, and within a month, he was commissioned to design the six-story Dyal–Upchurch Building, the first large structure in the barren downtown area. Other projects soon followed, including the new City Hall and private homes.

During a business trip to New York City in 1905, Klutho met Frank Lloyd Wright, and the event changed Klutho's life. Wright and other Chicago area architects had originated a new American style of design that became known as "Prairie School", which discarded traditional European standards, such as Roman arches and Greek columns. The new style appealed to Klutho, whose style changed to adopt the fresh ideas.

Between 1907 and the start of World War I, Klutho was commissioned to design dozens of buildings, including the Morocco Temple, Seminole Hotel, the Florida Life Building, the Bisbee Building, and the YMCA. In what is now the Springfield Historic District, he drew plans for the Klutho Apartments, the Claude Nolan Cadillac Building, the Florence Court Apartments and his own home. He also was involved in the design of buildings in the Avondale and Riverside neighborhoods.

In March 1910, Klutho agreed to design a building for Jacob and Morris Cohen's department store, to be named the St. James Building. Among the proposals sent to the Cohens was a striking design for a building with four floors, twice what had been requested. Klutho proposed a "mixed use" design that would contain small shops on the first floor exterior with the department store in the interior and on the second floor. The third and fourth floors would contain offices for rent. He convinced the brothers that their structure would become the center of commerce for Jacksonville and they embraced his idea.

Klutho not only designed the building, but acted as construction manager using the fast-track method, whereby work begins prior to design completion. Remarkably, the project was finished in less than a year and a half. The structure was named the St. James Building, and it was Klutho's crowning achievement. When dedicated on October 21, 1912, it was the largest structure in Jacksonville, occupying an entire city block. The St. James Building was the featured article in The Western Architect and Klutho's work was highlighted throughout the magazine in June 1914.

The most striking interior feature was a 75-foot octagonal glass dome, which served as a skylight. The elevators were open "cages", giving passengers a view of the store. The building exterior was decorated with large abstract terra-cotta ornaments.

Later generations in Jacksonville did not appreciate the creativity and style of his designs. His contributions to the rebirth of the city were mostly ignored, except by his colleagues. On this, he quoted Desiderius Erasmus: "In the land of the blind, a one-eyed man is king."
Klutho lived to be 91, but had little money, making his later years difficult. Following his death, much of his work was razed or "renovated". However, in the mid-1970s, a number of his creations were added to the National Register of Historic Places, assuring their preservation, and the Jacksonville Historical Society takes special interest in his work:
 Dyal–Upchurch Building
 Florida Baptist Building
 Old Jacksonville Free Public Library (a/k/a Carnegie Library)
 Larimer Memorial Library
 Morocco Temple
 St. James Building (now the Jacksonville City Hall)
 Thomas V. Porter House
 Alexander St. Clair-Abrams House
 Henry John Klutho House the architect's residence
 Bisbee Building
 Florida Life Building
 Hotel James in Palatka

Gallery

See also
 Architecture of Jacksonville

References
Notes

External links

 Jacksonville Architects at Jacksonville Historical Society
 Photographic exhibit on the Great Fire of 1901 and Aftermath, and includes images of Klutho and his buildings. Presented by the State Archives of Florida.
 RAP: Application for Historic District – Riverside / Avondale at Riverside Avondale Preservation
  at 

Henry John Klutho buildings
History of Jacksonville, Florida
1873 births
1964 deaths
Architects from Illinois
Modernist architects
Prairie School architecture
Architects from Jacksonville, Florida
People from Breese, Illinois
19th-century American architects
20th-century American architects